This is list of archives in Cyprus.

Archives in Cyprus 
 Cyprus State Archives

See also 

 List of archives
 List of museums in Cyprus
 Culture of Cyprus

External links 

 
Archives
Cyprus
Archives